Otto Tregonan (died 1439), of Tregonan, Cornwall, was an English politician.

He was a Member (MP) of the Parliament of England for Bodmin in 1410, 1411, November 1414, March 1416, 1417, May 1421 and 1425.

References

14th-century births
1439 deaths
English MPs 1410
People from St Keverne
Members of the Parliament of England for Bodmin
English MPs 1411
English MPs November 1414
English MPs March 1416
English MPs 1417
English MPs May 1421
English MPs 1425